Tanu Nona OBE  (c. 1902 — 10 December 1980) was an Australian pearler and politician. Nona, of mixed Samoan and Torres Strait Islander ancestry, operating pearling boats along the coast of Queensland from the 1920s until his death. He was also a local councillor on the Badu Island council and a leading figure in local government among the western islands group.

References

1900s births
1980 deaths
Politicians from Queensland
Australian sailors
Torres Strait Islanders
Australian people of Samoan descent
Officers of the Order of the British Empire
Pearlers
20th-century Australian politicians